BD+2 0594b (also known as K2-56b) is a massive exoplanet discovered by the Kepler spacecraft in collaboration with the HARPS spectrometer at La Silla in Chile.

Naming

BD+20 594b indicates that the planet circles a star found in the Bonner Durchmusterung catalogue, BD +20° 594, the 594th entry in the +20-degree zone (declinations from +19 to +20 degrees); and that it is the first planet discovered orbiting that star.

K2-56b indicates that the planet circles a star catalogued in the Kepler 2 mission catalogue (part of the extended K2 Kepler mission), the 56th one in the catalogue; and that it is the first planet discovered orbiting that star.

Planet
With a radius of 2.2 R🜨 and a mass of 16.31 M🜨, BD+20594b is substantially smaller than Neptune. Taking the estimates of its radius and mass at face value, the composition of the planet would be rocky, hence making it classified as a mega-Earth. BD+20594b's exact composition is still unknown.

The planet was discovered on January 28, 2016 by astrophysicist Néstor Espinoza and his team from the Catholic University of Chile, using data from the two-wheeled Kepler mission (K2). It orbits a K-type star 496.08 light years away in the constellation Taurus.

It is believed that planets with a radius greater than 1.6 times the Earth's are not usually rocky, making BD+20594b an exception to this rule.

See also
Mega-Earth

References

External links
Largest Rocky World Found - Universe Today

Aries (constellation)
Exoplanets discovered in 2016
Transiting exoplanets
Mega-Earths
Exoplanets discovered by K2